Han Xuan (born 13 January 1995) is a Chinese footballer currently playing as a central defender for Chinese Super League club Wuhan.

Career statistics

Club
.

References

1995 births
Living people
Chinese footballers
China youth international footballers
Association football defenders
China League One players
Chinese Super League players
Wuhan F.C. players
Shaanxi Chang'an Athletic F.C. players
21st-century Chinese people